The penny-farthing, also known as a high wheel, high wheeler or ordinary, is an early type of bicycle.  It was popular in the 1870s and 1880s, with its large front wheel providing high speeds (owing to its travelling a large distance for every rotation of the legs) and comfort (the large wheel provides greater shock absorption).

It became obsolete in the late 1880s with the development of modern bicycles, which provided similar speed amplification via chain-driven gear trains and comfort through pneumatic tires, and were marketed in comparison to penny-farthings as "safety bicycles" because of the reduced danger of falling and the reduced height to fall from.

The name came from the British penny and farthing coins, the penny being much larger than the farthing, so that the side view of the bicycle resembles a larger penny (the front wheel) leading a smaller farthing (the rear wheel). Although the name "penny-farthing" is now the most common, it was probably not used until the machines were nearly outdated; the first recorded print reference is from 1891 in Bicycling News. For most of their reign, they were simply known as "bicycles", and were the first machines to be so called (though they were not the first two-wheeled, pedaled vehicles). In the late 1890s, the name "ordinary" began to be used, to distinguish them from the emerging safety bicycles; this term and "hi-wheel" (and variants) are preferred by many modern enthusiasts.

Following the popularity of the boneshaker, Eugène Meyer, a Frenchman, invented the high-wheeler bicycle design in 1869 and fashioned the wire-spoke tension wheel. In 1878, Albert Pope began manufacturing the Columbia bicycle outside Boston, starting their two-decade heyday in America.

Although the trend was short-lived, the penny-farthing became a symbol of the late Victorian era. Its popularity also coincided with the birth of cycling as a sport.

History

Origins and development 

Eugène Meyer of Paris is now regarded as the father of the high bicycle by the International Cycling History Conference in place of James Starley. Meyer patented a wire-spoke tension wheel with individually adjustable spokes in 1869. They were called "spider" wheels in Britain when introduced there. Meyer produced a classic high bicycle design during the 1880s.

James Starley in Coventry added the tangent spokes and the mounting step to his famous bicycle named "Ariel". He is regarded as the father of the British cycling industry. Ball bearings, solid rubber tires and hollow-section steel frames became standard, reducing weight and making the ride much smoother.

Penny-farthing bicycles are dangerous because of the risk of headers (taking a fall over the handlebars head-first). Makers developed "moustache" handlebars, allowing the rider's knees to clear them, "Whatton" handlebars that wrapped around behind the legs, and ultimately (though too late, after development of the safety bicycle), the American "Eagle" and "Star" bicycles, whose large and small wheels were reversed. This prevented headers but left the danger of being thrown backwards when riding uphill. Other attempts included moving the seat rearward and driving the wheel by levers or treadles, as in the "Xtraordinary" and "Facile", or gears, by chain as in the "Kangaroo" or at the hub, as in the "Crypto"; another option was to move the seat well back, as in the "Rational".

Even so, bicycling remained the province of the urban well-to-do, and mainly men, until the 1890s, and was a salient example of conspicuous consumption.

Attributes 

The penny-farthing used a larger wheel than the velocipede, thus giving higher speeds on all but the steepest hills. In addition, the large wheel gave a smoother ride, important before the invention of pneumatic tires.

Although the high riding position seems daunting to some, mounting can be learned on a lower velocipede. Once the technique is mastered, a high wheeler can be mounted and dismounted easily on flat ground and some hills.

An attribute of the penny-farthing is that the rider sits high and nearly over the front axle. When the wheel strikes rocks and ruts, or under hard braking, the rider can be pitched forward off the bicycle head-first. Headers were relatively common and a significant, sometimes fatal, hazard. Riders coasting down hills often took their feet off the pedals and put them over the tops of the handlebars, so they would be pitched off feet-first instead of head-first.

Penny-farthing bicycles often used similar materials and construction as earlier velocipedes: cast iron frames, solid rubber tires, and plain bearings for pedals, steering, and wheels. They were often quite durable and required little service.

End of an era 

The well-known dangers of the penny-farthing were, for the time of its prominence, outweighed by its strengths. While it was a difficult, dangerous machine, it was simpler, lighter, and faster than the safer velocipedes of the time. Two new developments changed this situation, and led to the rise of the safety bicycle. The first was the chain drive, originally used on tricycles, allowing a gear ratio to be chosen independent of the wheel size. The second was the pneumatic bicycle tire, allowing smaller wheels to provide a smooth ride.

The nephew of one of the men responsible for popularity of the penny-farthing was largely responsible for its demise. James Starley had built the Ariel (spirit of the air) high-wheeler in 1870; but this was a time of innovation, and when chain drives were upgraded so that each link had a small roller, higher and higher speeds became possible without the need for a large front wheel.

In 1885, Starley's nephew John Kemp Starley took these new developments to launch the modern bicycle, the Rover safety bicycle, so-called because the rider, seated much lower and farther behind the front wheel contact point, was less prone to a header.

In 1888, when John Dunlop re-invented the pneumatic tire for his son's tricycle, the high wheel was made obsolete. The comfortable ride once found only on tall wheels could now be enjoyed on smaller chain-driven bicycles. By 1893, high-wheelers were no longer being produced. Use lingered into the 1920s in track cycling until racing safety bicycles were adequately designed.

Modern usage  
Today, enthusiasts ride restored penny-farthings, and a few manufacturers build new ones with modern materials. One of these manufacturers is UDC Penny Farthings, the largest penny-farthing manufacturer in the United Kingdom. The manufacturer recorded record sales of penny-farthings in 2020 during the COVID-19 lockdown. 

<p>The Penny Farthing Club is a cycling club that was founded in 2013 by Neil Laughton. The club offers rider training, bike tours of London and other UK cities, and hosts club events such as penny-farthing polo.

Characteristics 

The penny-farthing is a direct-drive bicycle, meaning the cranks and pedals are fixed directly to the hub. Instead of using gears to multiply the revolutions of the pedals, the driven wheel is enlarged to be close to the rider's inseam, to increase the maximum speed. This shifts the rider nearly on top of the wheel and makes it impossible for the rider to reach the ground while sitting on the seat.

Construction 

The frame is a single tube following the circumference of the front wheel, then diverting to a trailing wheel. A mounting peg is above the rear wheel. The front wheel is in a rigid fork with little if any trail. A spoon brake is usually fitted on the fork crown, operated by a lever from one of the handlebars. The bars are usually mustache shaped, dropping from the level of the headset. The saddle mounts on the frame less than  behind the headset.

One particular model, made by Pope Manufacturing Company in 1886, weighs , has a 60-spoke  front wheel and a 20-spoke  rear wheel. It is fitted with solid rubber tires. The rims, frame, fork, and handlebars are made from hollow, steel tubing. The steel axles are mounted in adjustable ball bearings. The leather saddle is suspended by springs.

Another model, made by Humber and Co., Ltd., of Beeston, Nottingham, weighs only , and has  and  wheels. It has no step and no brakes, in order to minimize weight.

A third model, also made by Pope Manufacturing Company, weighs  and has forged steel forks. A brake lever on the right of a straight handlebar operates a spoon brake against the front wheel.

All three have cranks that can be adjusted for length.

Operation 
Mounting requires skill. The rider must first grasp the handlebar and place one foot on a peg above the back wheel. Then the rider scoots the bicycle forward to gain momentum and quickly jumps up onto the seat while continuing to steer the bicycle and maintain balance. 

Although easy to ride slowly because of their high center of mass and the inverted pendulum effect, penny-farthings are prone to accidents. To stop, the rider presses back on the pedals while applying a spoon-shaped brake pressing the tire. The center of mass being high and not far behind the front wheel means any sudden stop or collision with a pothole or other obstruction can send the rider over the handlebars. On long downhills, some riders hooked their feet over the handlebars. This made for quick descents but left no chance of stopping. A new type of handlebar was introduced, called Whatton bars, that looped behind the legs so that riders could still keep their feet on the pedals and also be able to leap forward feet-first off the machine.

Performance 
Frederick Lindley Dodds, of Stockton-on-Tees, England, is credited with having set the first hour record, covering an estimated distance of 15 miles and 1,480 yards (25.493 kms) on a high-wheeler during a race on the Fenner's Track, Cambridge University on March 25, 1876.

The record for riding from Land's End to John o' Groats on a penny-farthing was set in 1886 by George Pilkington Mills with a time of five days, one hour, and 45 minutes. This record was broken in 2019 by Richard Thoday with a time of four days, 11 hours and 52 minutes.

This was beaten by Scots cyclist Mark Beaumont at Herne Hill Velodrome on 16 June 2018 when he covered .

On 17 September 2019, Chris Opie set the Guinness World Record of 34.547 kilometres in an hour.

In 1884, Thomas Stevens rode a Columbia penny-farthing from San Francisco to Boston—the first cyclist to cross the United States. In 1885–86, he continued from London through Europe, the Middle East, China, and Japan, to become the first to ride around the world.

Tremendous feats of balance were reported, including negotiating a narrow bridge parapet and riding down the U.S. Capitol steps with the American Star Bicycle which has the small wheel in front.

In popular culture 

The bike, with the one wheel dominating, led to riders being referred to in America as "wheelmen", a name that lived on for nearly a century in the League of American Wheelmen until renamed the League of American Bicyclists in 1994. Clubs of racing cyclists wore uniforms of peaked caps, tight jackets and knee-length breeches, with leather shoes, the caps and jackets displaying the club's colors. In 1967 collectors and restorers of penny-farthings (and other early bicycles) founded the Wheelmen, a non-profit organization "dedicated to keeping alive the heritage of American cycling".

The high-wheeler lives on in the gear inch units used by cyclists in English-speaking countries to describe gear ratios. These are calculated by multiplying the wheel diameter in inches by the number of teeth on the front chain-wheel and dividing by the teeth on the rear sprocket. The result is the equivalent diameter of a penny-farthing wheel. A 60-inch gear, the largest practicable size for a high-wheeler, is nowadays a middle gear of a utility bicycle, while top gears on many exceed 100 inches. There was at least one  Columbia made in the mid-1880s, but 60 was the largest in regular production.

A penny-farthing is the logo of The Village in the cult 1960s television series The Prisoner, and is also featured in the show's closing titles. Co-creator and star Patrick McGoohan stated that the bike represented slowing down the wheels of progress.  

The penny-farthing is a symbol of the cities of Sparta, Wisconsin; Davis, California; and Redmond, Washington.

Events 

 Each February in Evandale, Tasmania, penny-farthing enthusiasts from around the world converge on the small village for a series of penny-farthing races, including the national championship.
 In October there is a bicycle ride from the  statue of an 1890s bicyclist on a penny-farthing in Port Byron, Illinois named "Will B. Rolling" to a similar statue in Sparta, Wisconsin named "Ben Bikin'".
 In 2004, British leukemia patient and charity fundraiser Lloyd Scott (43) rode a penny-farthing across the Australian outback to raise money for a charitable cause.
 In November 2008, Briton Joff Summerfield completed a  round-the-world trip on a penny-farthing. Summerfield spent two-and-a-half years cycling through 23 countries, visiting locations including the Taj Mahal, Angkor Wat and Mount Everest.
 Knutsford in England has hosted the Knutsford Great Race every 10 years since 1980. The 1980 race had 15 team entries, and there were 16 in 1990 and 2000. The 2010 race was limited to 50 teams and was in aid of the ShelterBox charity.
 In 2012, the first Clustered Spires High Wheel Race took place in Frederick, Maryland, USA. This is the country's only race of its kind - a one-hour criterium race around a  course through the historic downtown district.

See also 

 Big Wheel, a tricycle
 High wheeler, an automobile
 Outline of cycling
 Monowheel, a single-wheeled vehicle
 Tall bike, an unusually tall bicycle
 Unicycle, a single-wheeled vehicle
 Velocipede, a predecessor
 Yike Bike, an electric "mini-farthing" design

References

External links 

Big Wheel Biker Video produced by Wisconsin Public Television

1869 introductions
History of cycling
Cycle types